Reckless & Me is the second studio album by actor-singer-producer Kiefer Sutherland. The album was released on April 26, 2019.

Background
About the release of the album, in an interview, Sutherland said: "I asked myself? What is the thing that I love about acting and music ? What is the common denominator? For me it's storytelling and music is a very different way of doing it".

The first single from the album, "Open Road", was released on December 21, 2018. The second single, "This Is How It's Done", was released on March 8, 2019. The third and fourth singles, "Something You Love" and "Faded Pair of Blue Jeans", were released on March 15, 2019, and April 5, 2019, respectively.

Track listing

Personnel
Jude Cole – production, engineering, composition
Chris Lord-Alge – engineering, mixing
Dave Way - engineering
 Clayton Cooper – photography, graphic design

Charts

References

2019 albums
Kiefer Sutherland albums